The 1993 Commonwealth Final was the tenth running of the Commonwealth Final as part of the qualification for the 1993 Speedway World Championship. The 1993 Final was run on 23 May at the Norfolk Arena in King's Lynn, England, and was part of the World Championship qualifying for riders from the Commonwealth nations.

Riders qualified for the Final from the Australian, British and New Zealand Championships.

The winner was Australian Leigh Adams and it was the first time that a rider from outside of Great Britain won the event.

1993 Commonwealth Final
23 May
 King's Lynn, Norfolk Arena
Qualification: Top 11 plus 1 reserve to the Overseas Final in Coventry, England

* Mitch Shirra replaced Mark Lyndon

References

See also
 Motorcycle Speedway

1993
World Individual
1993 in British motorsport
1993 in English sport